Morten Wold (born 22 June 1967) is a Norwegian politician for the Progress Party. He was elected to the Parliament of Norway from Buskerud in 2013 where he is a member of the Standing Committee on Health and Care Services.

References 

Progress Party (Norway) politicians
Members of the Storting
Buskerud politicians
1967 births
Living people
21st-century Norwegian politicians